Robert Atherton Rawstorne (4 March 1824 –  4 September 1902) was Archdeacon of Blackburn from 1885 until 1899.

Ecclesiastical career
Rawstorne was born in 1824, the son of Rev. Robert Atherton Rawstorne, who was rector of Warrington for 24 years. The Rawstorne family came from Lancashire, where they owned the Penwortham Priory and Hutton Hall. He was educated at Brasenose College, Oxford, where he took his degree in 1846; was ordained deacon in 1848 and priest in 1849 by James Prince Lee, Bishop of Manchester. After nomination by a kinsman, he received a perpetual curacy at Penwortham in 1852, and in 1859 he was appointed Vicar of Balderstone, where he served until 1897. He was proctor in convocation for the archdeaconry of Blackburn from 1880 to 1885, rural dean of Blackburn from 1880 to 1887, and archdeacon of Blackburn from 1885 to 1899.

He died at Balderstone Grange on 4 September 1902.

Family
Rowstmorne married Cecilia Feilden, daughter of Joseph Feilden, of Witton park in 1854.

His second son Henry Fielden Rawstorne (1859–1924) married in 1887 Mabel Katharina Whalley-Smythe-Gardiner (†1892) only child and heir of Sir John Brocas Whalley-Smythe-Gardiner, 4th & last Bart. of Roche Court. Their daughter Mabel Dorothy Rawstorne (1889–1936) was the second wife of Vice-Admiral Sir William Fane De Salis (1858–1939).

References

1824 births
1902 deaths
Alumni of Brasenose College, Oxford
Archdeacons of Blackburn